Patanga japonica is a species of grasshopper found in Japan, the Korean peninsula, Vietnam, and China.

References

Acrididae
Insects described in 1898
Taxa named by Ignacio Bolívar
Orthoptera of Asia